Vafsi (Tati: , Vowsi) is a dialect of the Tati language spoken in the Vafs village and surrounding area in the Markazi province of Iran. The dialects of the Tafresh region share many features with the Central Plateau dialects.

Grammar
Vafsi Tati has six short vowel phonemes, five long vowel phonemes and two nasal vowel phonemes. The consonant inventory is basically the same as in Persian.
Nouns are inflected for gender (masculine, feminine), number (singular, plural) and case (direct, oblique).

The oblique case marks the possessor (preceding the head noun), the definite direct object, nouns governed by a preposition, and the subject of transitive verbs in the past tense.
Personal pronouns are inflected for number (singular, plural) and case (direct, oblique).
A set of enclitic pronouns is used to indicate the agent of transitive verbs in the past tenses.

There are two demonstrative pronouns: one for near deixis, one for remote deixis.
The use of the Persian ezafe construction is spreading, however there is also a native possessive construction, consisting of the possessor (unmarked or marked by the oblique case) preceding the head noun.

The verbal inflection is based on two stems: present and past stem. Person and number are indicated personal suffixes attached to the stem. In the transitive past tense the verb consists of the bare past stem and personal concord with the subject is provided by enclitic pronouns following the stem or a constituent preceding the verb. Two modal prefixes are used to convey modal and aspectual information. The past participle is employed in the formation of compound tenses.

Vafsi Tati is a split ergative language: Split ergativity means that a language has in one domain accusative morphosyntax and in another domain ergative morphosyntax. In Vafsi the present tense is structured the accusative way and the past tense is structured the ergative way. Accusative morphosyntax means that in a language subjects of intransitive and transitive verbs are treated the same way and direct objects are treated another way. Ergative morphosyntax means that in a language subjects of intransitive verbs and direct objects are treated one way and subjects of transitive verbs are treated another way.

In the Vafsi past tense subjects of intransitive verbs and direct objects are marked by the direct case whereas subjects of transitive verbs are marked by the oblique case. This feature characterizes the Vafsi past tense as ergative.

The unmarked order of constituents is SOV like in most other Iranian languages.

Numerals
Numerals are transcribed in the IPA.

References

Further reading
 Yousefi, Saeed Reza. 2012. ‘Tahlil væ bærræsi-e halæt væ halæt-næmai dær væfsi dær Chârchube Nazari-e Behinegi’ [Case and Case Marking in Vafsi within the OT Framework]. M.A. Thesis. Shahid Beheshti University. Under the supervision of Mahinnaz Mirdehghan.
 Mirdehghan, Mahinnaz and Saeed Reza Yousefi. 2017. ‘Dative Case Marking in Vafsi within the OT Framework.’ In Iranian Studies, Vol. 5, No. 1, pp. 149–161. DOI: 10.1080/00210862.2015.1108720.
 Mirdehghan, Mahinnaz and Saeed Reza Yousefi. 1395/2016. ‘Hærf-e ezafenæmai-e efteraqi dær Vafsi dær čaharčub-e næzæri-e behinegi [Differential Adpositional Case Marking in Vafsi within the OT Framework].’ In Language Related Research, 7 (3), pp. 197–222, Tehran: Tarbiat Modares University.
 Donald Stilo. 2010. "Ditransitive Constructions in Vafsi: a Corpus-Based Study." In Studies in Ditransitive Constructions: A Comparative Handbook, edited by Andrej Malchukov et al. 243-276. de Gruyter.
 Stilo, Donald L. Summer - Autumn, 1981. “The Tati Language Group in the Sociolinguistic Context of Northwestern Iran and Transcaucasia.” Iranian Studies. Taylor & Francis, Ltd.
 Stilo, Donald L., and Ulrich Marzolph. 2004.Vafsi Folk Tales: Twenty Four Folk Tales in the Gurchani Dialect of Vafsi as Narrated by Ghazanfar Mahmudi and Mashdi Mahdi and Collected by Lawrence P. Elwell-Sutton. Wiesbaden: Reichert.
 Csató, Isaksson, and Jahani, trans. 2005. Linguistic Convergence and Areal Diffusion: Case Studies from Iranian Semitic and Turkic. RoutledgeCurzon.
 Stilo, Donald. 2004. "Coordination in three Western Iranian languages: Vafsi, Persian and Gilaki." Typological Studies in Language 58: 269-332.
 Stilo, Donald L. 1971. A grammar of Vafsi-Tati: An application of a transformational computer model. Unpublished PhD Dissertation, University of Michigan.
 Elwell-Sutton, Laurence Paul. 1960. The Vafsi Dialect (North-Western Persia).
 Bakhtyari, Behrooz Mahmoudi. "Vafsi Folk Tales. Wiesbaden, Ludwig Reichert Verlag, 2004, 288 p., biblio., no index.", Abstracta Iranica [En ligne], Volume 27. 2004. document 34, mis en ligne le 02 janvier 2007, consulté le 20 février 2014.
 Vafsi numerals

External links
 Vafs Village Weblog(in Persian language)
 Vafsi Folk Tales
 Coordination in three Western Iranian languages: Vafsi, Persian and Gilaki
 A Description of the Northwest Iranian Project at the Max Planck Institute for Evolutionary Anthropology

Languages of Iran
Northwestern Iranian languages
Markazi Province